Osney Lock is a lock on the River Thames in Oxford, England, where the village or island of Osney is next to the river.

The first lock was built of stone by Daniel Harris for the Thames Navigation Commission in 1790.

Across the weir pool is a large Environment Agency complex which monitors the River Thames, while a small office building exists on the front lawn opposite from the lock house. The weir is upstream of the lock alongside the navigation channel in two parts and feeds the Osney pool. The Osney Lock Hydro hydro-electric plant occupies a building beside the weir.

To the south and southwest are Osney Mill Marina and Osney Cemetery. Oxford railway station on the Botley Road is close by to the northwest.

History

The main navigation channel was formerly on the branch of the river known as Bulstake Stream further west.  The present stream was developed in mediaeval times by the monks of Osney Abbey on the west side of the island then known as Osney, to serve as a millstream for Osney Mill, in a manner similar to that at Abingdon. There was an ancient weir, the property of the Abbey on the site, and a pound lock was first considered in 1787. The stream became the main navigation channel when the lock was built in 1790.  Daniel Harris used prisoner labour from Oxford jail to give the cheapest quote for the work. The last rebuilding of the lock was in 1905.

Access to the lock
The lock can be reached a short way down the towpath from Osney Bridge on the A420 Botley Road on the way west out of the centre of Oxford.

Reach above the lock
The river passes a former electricity generating station and is crossed by Osney Bridge near Oxford railway station. On the eastern bank are built up parts of Oxford. After a stretch of allotments on the western bank and the backs of houses on the eastern bank there is the curious water crossroads - "Four Rivers". This provides a link to the Oxford Canal via the Sheepwash Channel in one direction and there is Bulstake Stream in the other direction. The river runs through willow banks until it reaches Fiddler's Island. There used to be a weir and flash lock here; now there is the rainbow shaped Medley Footbridge crossing the main channel. On the other side of the island is Castle Mill Stream, an old navigation channel that runs to the east closer to the centre of Oxford rejoining the Thames below the lock. On the eastern bank is the open ground of Port Meadow as far as Wolvercote. 

There are navigation transit markers alongside Port Meadow upstream of Medley Boat station, to allow river users to check their speed. A powered boat should not pass between the markers in under one minute.

The Thames Path crosses to the Oxford side at Osney Bridge and then crosses Fiddler's Island and Medley Footbridge returning to the western bank to continue to Godstow Lock.

See also
 Locks on the River Thames

Sources

External links
 Osney Lock at Geograph

References

1790 establishments in England

Locks on the River Thames
Locks of Oxfordshire
Transport in Oxford